Rod Smith (1925-2016) was a Grey Cup champion Canadian Football League player. He played offensive guard.

A graduate of University of Toronto, Smith played at least one year with the Toronto Balmy Beach Beachers, and then took 1948 off from football (to work in South Africa). He joined the Montreal Alouettes in 1949 and was part of the Larks first Grey Cup championship. He worked as a civil engineer while playing with the Als.

After retiring from the CLF, he worked as a civil engineer in Colombia.

References

Montreal Alouettes players
University of Toronto alumni
Players of Canadian football from Ontario
Sportspeople from Guelph
Ontario Rugby Football Union players
Toronto Balmy Beach Beachers players
1925 births
2016 deaths